An annular solar eclipse occurred on January 23, 1860 during summer. A solar eclipse occurs when the Moon passes between Earth and the Sun, thereby totally or partly obscuring the image of the Sun for a viewer on Earth. An annular solar eclipse occurs when the Moon's apparent diameter is smaller than the Sun's, blocking most of the Sun's light and causing the Sun to look like an annulus (ring). An annular eclipse appears as a partial eclipse over a region of the Earth thousands of kilometres wide.

Description
The eclipse was visible in much of the South Island and the southernmost portion of North Island around Wellington in New Zealand, it was also visible in all of Antarctica (much of the areas had a 24-hour daylight), South America's Patagonia and Oceanian islands such as Macquarrie, Chatham, Antipodes, Tahiti and Tuamotu It was part of solar saros 119.

On the other side as the Moon from the Earth headed towards the left at New Zealand, as the umbral path was outside the South Pole and over the Prime Meridian to the Peninsula, the Moon from the Earth was seen as it was going on bottom, then on the right and on top in the peninsular portion though the Earth rotates to the east as it was north of the South Pole at the Prime Meridian, the rest of the world saw the Moon from the Earth headed towards the left.

The umbral portion was 719 km (449 mi) long and started in Northern Antarctica from east of the Prime Meridian to the 40th meridian east all the way to the west of its peninsula and was shown up to 91% obscuration of the sun. The greatest occurred within the Pacific in Peninsular Antarctica at 71.8 N & 117.2  W at 0:27 UTC (4:27 PM local time on January 22) and lasted for over 6 minutes.

The eclipse showed up to 50% obscuration off the coast of Antarctica in the area separating the Indian and the Pacific Oceans.

Related eclipses

Saros 119 
It is a part of Saros cycle 119, repeating every 18 years, 11 days, containing 71 events. The series started with partial solar eclipse on May 15, 850 AD. It contains total eclipses on August 9, 994 AD and August 20, 1012 with a hybrid eclipse on August 31, 1030. It has annular eclipses from September 10, 1048 through March 18, 1950. The series ends at member 71 as a partial eclipse on June 24, 2112. The longest duration of totality was only 32 seconds on August 20, 1012. The longest duration of annularity was 7 minutes, 37 seconds on September 1, 1625. The longest duration of hybridity was only 18 seconds on August 31, 1030.

See also 
 List of solar eclipses in the 19th century

References

External links 
 Google interactive maps
 Solar eclipse data

1860 in science
1860 in New Zealand
1860 01
January 1860 events